The Adventures of Peter Rabbit & Benjamin Bunny is a 1996 interactive children's storybook video game developed and published by Mindscape for Windows and Macintosh in association with Beatrix Potter publisher  Frederick Warne & Co.

The game encourage play through interactive hotspots.

Coming Soon Magazine deemed it one of the best interactive storybooks ever made. PC Mag felt it offered a "wonderful introduction" to the Peter Rabbit universe. The Advocate-Messenger praised the " magnificent watercolor quality animation". Standard Speaker noted that everything is "faithfully transferred" from the source material.

References

External links
 https://www.chicagotribune.com/news/ct-xpm-1996-04-12-9604120386-story.html

1996 video games
Windows games
Mindscape games
Classic Mac OS games
Peter Rabbit
Video games based on books
Video games about rabbits and hares
Video games set in forests
Video games developed in the United States